The 2000 Division 1 season was the 35th of the competition of the first-tier football in Senegal.  The tournament was organized by the Senegalese Football Federation.  The season began on 9 April and finished on 3 September 2000.  ASC Diaraf won the ninth title and participated in the 2001 CAF Champions League the following year.  ASEC Ndiambour participated in the 2001 CAF Cup of Cups and  ASEC Ndiambour in the 2001 CAF Winners' Cup.

The season would feature only twelve clubs, the following season would return again to fourteen clubs.

ASC Jeanne d'Arc was the defending team of the title.  The season featured 132 matches and scored 197 goals, less than last season.

Participating clubs

 US Gorée
 Compagnie sucrière sénégalaise (Senegalese Sugar Company)
 ASC Port Autonome
 AS Douanes
 ASC Jeanne d'Arc
 ASC Cambérène

 ASC Niayès-Pikine
 ASC Diaraf
 US Rail
 ETICS Mboro
 SONACOS
 ASEC Ndiambour

Overview
The league was contested by 12 teams with ASC Diaraf winning the championship.

League standings

Footnotes

External links
Historic results at rsssf.com

Senegal
Senegal Premier League seasons